Liptena ouesso is a butterfly in the family Lycaenidae. It is found in Cameroon and the Republic of the Congo.

Subspecies
Liptena ouesso ouesso (Cameroon, Congo)
Liptena ouesso mayombe Stempffer, Bennett & May, 1974 (Congo: Brazzaville)

References

Butterflies described in 1974
Liptena